Chad Brannon is an American actor. Brannon is recognized for his role as Zander Smith on General Hospital.

Career
In 2000, Chad Brannon started playing Zander Smith on the daytime soap opera General Hospital. He played the character from 2000 to 2004, until he was killed off, and won a Daytime Emmy Award for Outstanding Younger Actor in a Drama Series in 2004.  He has also guest starred on Friday Night Lights, Cold Case, and Deadwood. Another of his roles includes Tolten from the Xbox 360 RPG Lost Odyssey. In 2008, FOX brought on Chad as one of the main network announcers covering many of their hit shows such as The Simpsons, Family Guy, Glee, Sons of Tucson, American Dad, and The Cleveland Show.

On December 22, 2009, Brannon returned to General Hospital, in a cameo as a character known only as Aaron. He appeared alongside Natalia Livingston, who was playing the twin of her previous character. In February 2021, Entertainment Weekly reported Brannon had returned to General Hospital in an undisclosed role. Brannon appeared on the March 16, 2021 episode as the "ghost" of Zander, interacting in scenes with Zander's son, Cameron.

Filmography

References

External links
http://www.imdb.com/name/nm0105172/
http://chadbrannon.com/

1979 births
American male soap opera actors
Living people
Daytime Emmy Award winners
Daytime Emmy Award for Outstanding Younger Actor in a Drama Series winners